Baljić is a Bosnian surname. Notable people with the surname include:

 Elvir Baljić (born 1974), Bosnian footballer and manager
 Mirsad Baljić (born 1962), Bosnian footballer

See also
 Bajić

Bosnian surnames